The 1952 Formula One season was the sixth season of FIA Formula One motor racing. In comparison to previous seasons, the 1952 season consisted of a relatively small number of Formula One races, following the decision to run all the Grand Prix events counting towards the World Championship of Drivers to Formula Two regulations rather than Formula One. The Indianapolis 500, which also counted towards the World Championship, was still run to AAA regulations as in previous seasons.

The 3rd FIA World Championship of Drivers, which began on 18 May and ended on 7 September after eight races, was won by Alberto Ascari, driving for Scuderia Ferrari.

In addition to the Formula One races and the World Championship Formula Two races, numerous other Formula Two races, which did not count towards the championship, were held during the year.

World Championship season summary
Alfa Romeo, unable to fund a new car, withdrew from racing, while BRM had been preparing two V16-powered cars for the season but withdrew them before an April race at Valentino Park, Turin, while attempting to enlist Juan Manuel Fangio as teammate to Stirling Moss, leaving Ferrari as the only serious Formula One contender. This led World Championship organizers to run their races for Formula Two, utilising 2-litre naturally aspirated engines, which meant larger fields and a greater variety of cars, even if the victories all went to Ferrari. Ascari won the six Grands Prix he entered, missing the Swiss race because he was at Indianapolis qualifying for the Indianapolis 500 – the first European to do so in the World Championship era. Maserati and Gordini offered little challenge, but Mike Hawthorn's drives in his Cooper would earn him a works Ferrari drive in 1953. Reigning champion Fangio, badly injured in an early season crash at Monza, took no part in the championship but was to go on to drive for BRM.

Race 1: Switzerland

For the second successive season, the championship's opening round was the Swiss Grand Prix, held at the Bremgarten Circuit in Bern. Ferrari's lead driver Ascari was absent due to his participation in the Indianapolis 500, so it was left to his teammates Nino Farina and Piero Taruffi to secure the first two places on the grid. Farina led from the start until he retired with magneto failure, leaving Taruffi to win his only championship Grand Prix and take the extra point for the fastest lap. Farina took over the car of his other teammate, Andre Simon, and was battling debutant Jean Behra for second place before both experienced mechanical trouble, Farina again unable to continue. It was, therefore, privateer Rudi Fischer who completed a Ferrari 1–2, with Jean Behra in third for Gordini. Ken Wharton finished fourth driving a Frazer-Nash, the manufacturer's only ever points finish.

Race 2: Indianapolis 500

As usual, the Indianapolis 500 had little bearing on the championship result, although regular Ferrari driver Alberto Ascari did compete, retiring after 40 laps. The race was dominated by Bill Vukovich, who led 150 laps before retiring. It was left to Troy Ruttman to win the race from Jim Rathmann and Sam Hanks.

Race 3: Belgium

Ascari returned to Ferrari for round 3 of the championship at Spa-Francorchamps, with Maserati still absent as they developed their A6GCM. The Ferrari cars dominated the weekend, with Ascari taking pole, the race win, and the fastest lap while leading every lap bar one. He was followed home by teammate Nino Farina, and Robert Manzon finished in third for Gordini. Jean Behra again impressed as he led the opening lap before falling behind the Ferrari juggernaut and eventually retiring after an incident with the third Ferrari of Piero Taruffi.

Race 4: France

Scuderia Ferrari dominated once again at Rouen, taking all three podium places. Ascari led all the way from pole position to assume the championship lead and achieve his fourth career victory, drawing him level with his teammate Nino Farina who finished second. Piero Taruffi finished third after falling behind the Gordinis of Robert Manzon and Jean Behra at the start. Manzon was the highest Non-Ferrari finisher ahead of his teammate Maurice Trintignant, who drove an older model.

Race 5: Britain

Although Ascari again dominated, it wasn't plain sailing for his teammates as Ferrari eventually dominated as they had done throughout the year. The Italian's third consecutive victory strengthened his eventually successful championship challenge as his main competitor, Nino Farina, failed to score despite taking pole position. The third Ferrari of Piero Taruffi dropped down to ninth at the start but eventually recovered to take second place, while a pitstop for new spark plugs meant Farina finished in the sixth position. It was a triumphant day for British cars and drivers, with Mike Hawthorn taking his first podium driving a Cooper-Bristol, while British cars and drivers occupied the other points-paying positions.

Race 6: Germany

The belated arrival of the Maserati factory team failed to stop the dominance of Ferrari, with Ascari clinching his first World Title and equalling the injured Juan Manuel Fangio's win record. It was his fourth consecutive victory of the season, again leading every race lap from pole position. He briefly lost the race lead to Farina after pitting for oil, but this is not reflected in the lap charts as he caught and passed his teammate before they crossed the line at the end of the lap. Farina finished second, and privateer Ferrari driver Rudi Fischer finished third ahead of the works car of Taruffi to ensure a Ferrari 1-2-3-4. Jean Behra scored the final points for Gordini just ahead of another Ferrari car, this time driven by Roger Laurent.

Race 7: Netherlands

Ascari started from pole position and led from start to finish, taking the fastest lap as well, winning his fifth consecutive Grand Prix and earning his second consecutive Grand Slam, and the third his season and career. In addition, with his victory, Ascari overtook Fangio as the winningest Formula One Driver, although the Argentinian would eventually reclaim the record at the 1955 Argentine Grand Prix. Further down the order, Giuseppe Farina and Luigi Villoresi, also driving for Ferrari, completed the podium, resulting in an Italian 1-2-3 and a 1-2-3 for the Scuderia. As a result, Ascari extended his championship points total to 36, extending his lead to 12 points over second-placed Farina.

Race 8: Italy

The 80-lap race was won by Ferrari driver Alberto Ascari after he started from pole position. José Froilán González finished second for the Maserati team and Ascari's teammate Luigi Villoresi came in third.

World Championship season review
The 1952 World Championship of Drivers was contested over an eight-race series.

All 1952 World Championship Grand Prix events were restricted to Formula Two cars, and the Indianapolis 500-Mile Race, which also counted towards the 1952 AAA Championship, was contested by AAA National Championship cars. The Spanish Grand Prix was scheduled to be held on 26 October at the Pedralbes Circuit in Barcelona but was cancelled due to monetary reasons.

Teams and drivers
The following teams and drivers competed in the 1952 FIA World Championship of Drivers. The list does not include those that contested only the Indianapolis 500 event.

* Car entered only in the Indianapolis 500 race

World Championship of Drivers standings

Points were awarded to the top five finishers in each race on an 8–6–4–3–2 basis. One point was awarded for the fastest lap. Points for shared drives were divided equally between the drivers, regardless of who had driven more laps. Only the best four of eight scores counted towards the World Championship.

 † Position shared between more drivers of the same car
 * Point for fastest lap shared between different drivers.
 Only the best four results counted towards the championship. Numbers without parentheses are championship points; numbers in parentheses are total points scored.

Non-championship races
Other Formula One/Formula Two races, which did not count towards the World Championship of Drivers, were also held in 1952.

East German races
Note - a blue background denotes a round of the East German Championship.

East German Championship
The table below shows the points awarded for each race. Only East German drivers were eligible for points.

References

Formula One seasons
 
Formula Two series